The Chinese Ambassador to North Macedonia is the official representative of the People's Republic of China to the Republic of North Macedonia.

List of representatives

References 

 
Macedonia Republic of
China